The 1927–28 New York Rangers season was the franchise's second season. In the regular season, the Rangers finished in second place in the American Division with a 19–16–9 record and qualified for the Stanley Cup playoffs. In a pair of two-game total goals series, New York defeated the Pittsburgh Pirates and Boston Bruins to advance to the Stanley Cup Finals, where they faced the Montreal Maroons. The Rangers defeated the Maroons 3–2 to win their first Stanley Cup.

Regular season

Final standings

Record vs. opponents

Schedule and results

|- align="center" bgcolor="#CCFFCC"
| 1 || 15 || @ Toronto Maple Leafs || 4–2 || 1–0–0
|- align="center" bgcolor="#CCFFCC"
| 2 || 17 || Ottawa Senators || 3–2 || 2–0–0
|- align="center" bgcolor="#CCFFCC"
| 3 || 20 || @ New York Americans || 2–1 || 3–0–0
|- align="center" bgcolor="#FFBBBB"
| 4 || 22 || Montreal Maroons || 4–3 || 3–1–0
|- align="center" bgcolor="white"
| 5 || 27 || Boston Bruins || 1 – 1 OT || 3–1–1
|- align="center" bgcolor="#CCFFCC"
| 6 || 29 || @ Ottawa Senators || 2–1 || 4–1–1
|-

|- align="center" bgcolor="white"
| 7 || 1 || @ Montreal Maroons || 1 – 1 OT || 4–1–2
|- align="center" bgcolor="#FFBBBB"
| 8 || 3 || @ Chicago Black Hawks || 4–2 || 4–2–2
|- align="center" bgcolor="#CCFFCC"
| 9 || 4 || @ Detroit Cougars || 3–1 || 5–2–2
|- align="center" bgcolor="white"
| 10 || 6 || @ Pittsburgh Pirates || 2 – 2 OT || 5–2–3
|- align="center" bgcolor="#FFBBBB"
| 11 || 11 || Montreal Canadiens || 2–0 || 5–3–3
|- align="center" bgcolor="#CCFFCC"
| 12 || 13 || @ Boston Bruins || 3–2 || 6–3–3
|- align="center" bgcolor="#FFBBBB"
| 13 || 15 || Detroit Cougars || 2–1 || 6–4–3
|- align="center" bgcolor="#CCFFCC"
| 14 || 20 || Pittsburgh Pirates || 2–0 || 7–4–3
|- align="center" bgcolor="#CCFFCC"
| 15 || 25 || Chicago Black Hawks || 2–0 || 8–4–3
|- align="center" bgcolor="#FFBBBB"
| 16 || 27 || @ Boston Bruins || 2–0 || 8–5–3
|- align="center" bgcolor="white"
| 17 || 29 || New York Americans || 3 – 3 OT || 8–5–4
|- align="center" bgcolor="#FFBBBB"
| 18 || 31 || @ Montreal Canadiens || 1–0 || 8–6–4
|-

|- align="center" bgcolor="#FFBBBB"
| 19 || 3 || Detroit Cougars || 4–2 || 8–7–4
|- align="center" bgcolor="#CCFFCC"
| 20 || 8 || Chicago Black Hawks || 5–0 || 9–7–4
|- align="center" bgcolor="white"
| 21 || 12 || Boston Bruins || 2 – 2 OT || 9–7–5
|- align="center" bgcolor="#FFBBBB"
| 22 || 14 || @ Toronto Maple Leafs || 6–1 || 9–8–5
|- align="center" bgcolor="#CCFFCC"
| 23 || 15 || @ Detroit Cougars || 2–1 || 10–8–5
|- align="center" bgcolor="#FFBBBB"
| 24 || 17 || Toronto Maple Leafs || 2–1 || 10–9–5
|- align="center" bgcolor="#CCFFCC"
| 25 || 22 || Pittsburgh Pirates || 4–1 || 11–9–5
|- align="center" bgcolor="#CCFFCC"
| 26 || 26 || Detroit Cougars || 3–0 || 12–9–5
|- align="center" bgcolor="#CCFFCC"
| 27 || 29 || @ New York Americans || 7–0 || 13–9–5
|- align="center" bgcolor="#CCFFCC"
| 28 || 31 || Montreal Maroons || 3–1 || 14–9–5
|-

|- align="center" bgcolor="#FFBBBB"
| 29 || 4 || @ Pittsburgh Pirates || 4–2 || 14–10–5
|- align="center" bgcolor="white"
| 30 || 7 || Ottawa Senators || 0 – 0 OT || 14–10–6
|- align="center" bgcolor="white"
| 31 || 9 || @ Ottawa Senators || 0 – 0 OT || 14–10–7
|- align="center" bgcolor="#FFBBBB"
| 32 || 12 || Chicago Black Hawks || 3–0 || 14–11–7
|- align="center" bgcolor="#FFBBBB"
| 33 || 19 || Boston Bruins || 2–0 || 14–12–7
|- align="center" bgcolor="#CCFFCC"
| 34 || 23 || Pittsburgh Pirates || 3–0 || 15–12–7
|- align="center" bgcolor="#CCFFCC"
| 35 || 25 || @ Chicago Black Hawks || 1–0 || 16–12–7
|- align="center" bgcolor="white"
| 36 || 26 || @ Detroit Cougars || 0 – 0 OT || 16–12–8
|- align="center" bgcolor="#CCFFCC"
| 37 || 28 || Toronto Maple Leafs || 1–0 || 17–12–8
|-

|- align="center" bgcolor="#FFBBBB"
| 38 || 6 || @ Montreal Maroons || 3–1 || 17–13–8
|- align="center" bgcolor="#FFBBBB"
| 39 || 8 || @ Montreal Canadiens || 4–3 || 17–14–8
|- align="center" bgcolor="white"
| 40 || 10 || @ Boston Bruins || 3 – 3 OT || 17–14–9
|- align="center" bgcolor="#FFBBBB"
| 41 || 13 || Montreal Canadiens || 4–1 || 17–15–9
|- align="center" bgcolor="#CCFFCC"
| 42 || 18 || New York Americans || 7–3 || 18–15–9
|- align="center" bgcolor="#CCFFCC"
| 43 || 21 || @ Chicago Black Hawks || 6–1 || 19–15–9
|- align="center" bgcolor="#FFBBBB"
| 44 || 24 || @ Pittsburgh Pirates || 4–2 || 19–16–9
|-

Playoffs

The circus knocked the Rangers out of Madison Square Garden, and all games for the Stanley Cup Finals were played in the Montreal Forum. The Maroons won game one 2–0, as Red Dutton and Bill "Bat" Phillips scored goals, and goaltender Clint Benedict made 19 saves.

A well-known incident occurred in game two when Nels Stewart fired a hard shot that struck New York goaltender Lorne Chabot in the eye. He could not continue, and the Rangers needed a goaltender. However, when the Maroons refused to let the Rangers use Alex Connell or minor league goaltender Hugh McCormick, Rangers coach Lester Patrick decided to don the pads himself. The Rangers then increased their defensive pressure when any Maroon attempted a shot on Patrick. Bill Cook scored, putting the Rangers ahead 1–0, but Nels Stewart was not to be denied and scored, tying the game. In overtime, Frank Boucher got the winner for the Rangers 7:05 into overtime. The 44-year-old Patrick made 17 saves in his goaltending stint.

Joe "Red Light" Miller, New York Americans goalie, was allowed to take Chabot's place in goal, and he played well in a 2–0 loss in game three. However, Frank Boucher starred as the Rangers took the next two games, and the Stanley Cup; he scored twice in the Rangers' 2–1 game five victory. The Rangers almost lost another goalie to injury in the final game when Miller was badly cut while Murray Murdoch attempted to clear a loose puck away from goal, but he was able to continue. The crowd became unruly in the third period, throwing objects onto the ice after referee Mike Rodden disallowed an apparent game-tying goal by the Maroons. Even NHL president Frank Calder was a target of some fans immediately following the game. The Rangers became the second Stanley Cup champion from the United States, and the NHL's first American Cup-winning team.

Key:  Win  Loss

Player statistics
Skaters

Goaltenders

Goaltenders

†Denotes player spent time with another team before joining Rangers. Stats reflect time with Rangers only.
‡Traded mid-season. Stats reflect time with Rangers only.

See also
 1927–28 NHL season

References

New York Rangers seasons
New York Rangers
New York Rangers
New York Rangers
New York Rangers
Madison Square Garden
Stanley Cup championship seasons
1920s in Manhattan